This is a list of bridges and other crossings of the Lower Mississippi River from the Ohio River downstream to the Gulf of Mexico. Locations are listed with the left bank (moving downriver) listed first.

Crossings

See also
List of crossings of the Upper Mississippi River
List of crossings of the Ohio River
List of crossings of the Arkansas River

References

External links 

The Bridges And Structures Of The Lower Mississippi River
Trains Magazine: Trackside Guide, Mississippi River Crossings

Mississippi River crossings
Mississippi River crossings
Mississippi River crossings
Mississippi River crossings
Mississippi River
Lists of river crossings in Kentucky
Lists of river crossings in Tennessee
Mississippi River crossings